Kemal Mešić (born 4 August 1985, in Rogatica) is a shot putter and discus thrower from Bosnia and Herzegovina.

He competed at the 2012 Olympic Games and the 2016 Olympic Games, both times without reaching the final.

His personal best throw in shot put is 20.83 meters, achieved in June 2019 in Sarajevo, Bosnia and Herzegovina, and 56.88 meters in the discus throw, achieved in May 2009 in Tallahassee, Florida.

Competition record

References

External links
 

1985 births
Living people
Bosnia and Herzegovina male shot putters
Bosniaks of Bosnia and Herzegovina
Athletes (track and field) at the 2012 Summer Olympics
Athletes (track and field) at the 2016 Summer Olympics
Olympic athletes of Bosnia and Herzegovina
Bosnia and Herzegovina male discus throwers
World Athletics Championships athletes for Bosnia and Herzegovina
Athletes (track and field) at the 2015 European Games
European Games competitors for Bosnia and Herzegovina
Bosnia and Herzegovina expatriate sportspeople in the United States
Athletes (track and field) at the 2009 Mediterranean Games
Athletes (track and field) at the 2013 Mediterranean Games
Mediterranean Games competitors for Bosnia and Herzegovina